Handball at the 1984 Summer Olympics featured competition for men and women. Due to the USSR-led boycott some strong handball nations from Eastern Bloc did not compete; this gave an opportunity to the Yugoslav team to take both gold medals.  Games were played at Titan Gym in Fullerton, California.

Medal summary

Participating nations

Each qualified country was allowed to enter one team of 15 players and they all were eligible for participation. Four nations competed in both tournaments.

A total of 259(*) handball players (177 men and 82 women) from 14 nations (men from 12 nations - women from 6 nations) competed at the Los Angeles Games:

  (men:15 women:0)
  (men:0 women:15)
  (men:0 women:13)
  (men:14 women:0)
  (men:15 women:13)
  (men:15 women:0)
  (men:15 women:0)
  (men:15 women:0)
  (men:15 women:13)
  (men:15 women:0)
  (men:15 women:0)
  (men:15 women:0)
  (men:14 women:13)
  (men:14 women:15)
(*) NOTE: There are only players counted, which participated in one game at least.

Medal table

See also
 Handball at the Friendship Games

References

External links
Official Olympic Report

 
1984 Summer Olympics events
Olym
1984 Summer Olympics
Olymp